Alleanza Nazzjonali Republikana (ANR) (National Republican Alliance) was a Maltese pressure group formed in 2005 with Martin Degiorgio, Philip Beattie and Paul Salomone as its spokespersons.

It had been described as "far-right"  and was thought to have connections with the political party Imperium Europa. However, the Alliance disclaimed any such connections , describing itself as "a conservative, Christian-inspired, nationalist political pressure group" .

The Alliance organised two demonstrations against illegal immigration in Valletta in 2005 and 2006. It faded with the creation of the National Action party in 2007.

Politics of Malta
Political organisations based in Malta
Political advocacy groups in Malta
Organizations established in 2005